Rosendaël (meaning "rose valley") is a former commune in the Nord department in northern France. In 1971 it was merged into Dunkirk. It currently has 18,272 inhabitants (an almost ten-fold increase since 1825) in an area of 3.97 km2.

Heraldry

Rosendaël also has its own flag, Barry of 6 gules and vert

See also
Communes of the Nord department
Roosendael Abbey in Antwerp, Belgium
Roosendaal, city in North Brabant, Netherlands
Rozendaal, South Holland, town in the Netherlands
Rozendaal, town in Gelderland, Netherlands
Jack Rosendaal (born 1973), Dutch decathlete

References

Dunkirk
Former communes of Nord (French department)
French Flanders